Frans Oskar Lilius  (15 April 1871 - 12 December 1928) was a Finnish politician. He was a member of the Senate of Finland. He was born in Messukylä and died in Helsinki.

See also
Minister of Justice (Finland)
Supreme Court of Finland
Young Finnish Party
Lilius

1871 births
1928 deaths
Politicians from Tampere
People from Häme Province (Grand Duchy of Finland)
Young Finnish Party politicians
Finnish senators
Ministers of Justice of Finland
Members of the Parliament of Finland (1911–13)
Members of the Parliament of Finland (1913–16)
Members of the Parliament of Finland (1916–17)
University of Helsinki alumni